Vandalism is Deluhi's first best of album. The album peaked #87 in the Oricon charts and charted for two weeks.

Track listing

Single information
"Revolver Blast"
Released: March 24, 2010
Oricon Chart peak position: #51

"Two Hurt"
Released: August 5, 2009
Oricon Chart peak position: #114

References

2011 albums
Deluhi albums
Japanese-language albums